The 2015–16 Dominica Premier League was the 52nd staging of the competition. The season began on 4 October 2015 and ended on 28 February 2016.

Clubs 

Aicons
Dublanc Strikers
Exodus
Harlem United
Northern Bombers
Scotia Bank Bath Estate
Sagicor South East United
Signman Middleham United

Table

References 

2015-16
Football in Dominica
2015–16 in Caribbean football leagues
football
football